US Post Office-Brazil is a historic post office building located at Brazil, Clay County, Indiana.  It was designed by the Office of the Supervising Architect under James Knox Taylor and built in 1911–1913 in the Classical Revival style.  It is a two-story, brick building over a raised granite faced basement.  The front facade features a blind colonnade with six Tuscan order columns of Indiana limestone.  It has a hipped roof hidden from view by a parapet.

It has housed the Clay County Historical Society Museum since 1980.

It was added to the National Register of Historic Places in 1994.  It is located in the Brazil Downtown Historic District.

See also 
List of United States post offices

References

External links 
Clay County Historical Society Museum

Brazil
Neoclassical architecture in Indiana
Government buildings completed in 1913
Buildings and structures in Clay County, Indiana
National Register of Historic Places in Clay County, Indiana
1913 establishments in Indiana
Museums in Clay County, Indiana
Individually listed contributing properties to historic districts on the National Register in Indiana